In Greek mythology, Diopatra (Ancient Greek: Διοπατρη Diopatrê) was a naiad of Mount Othrys and one of the Spercheides. She was the daughter of the river-god Spercheus and the naiad Deino. As recounted by Cerambus, when the god Poseidon fell in love with Diopatre, the god transformed her sisters into poplars in order to ravish the girl; some nymphs, outraged by the tale and other rumours he spread about themselves, turned Cerambus into a beetle. Diopatra's name means "divine family" which came from dion and patra.

Note

Reference 
 Antoninus Liberalis, The Metamorphoses of Antoninus Liberalis translated by Francis Celoria (Routledge 1992). Online version at the Topos Text Project.

Naiads
Women of Poseidon
Metamorphoses into trees in Greek mythology